The Seoul SK Knights is a professional basketball club in the Korean Basketball League. The club was originally founded by Jinro Group in 1997 as Cheongju Jinro McCass. Before the official launch of the basketball club, Jinro Group filed for bankruptcy due to the 1997 Asian financial crisis, and eventually sold the club to SK Telecom.

Current roster

Enlisted players

Honours

Domestic

Korean Basketball League
KBL Championship
 Winners (3): 1999–2000, 2017–18, 2021–22
 Runners-up (2): 2001–02, 2012–13

KBL Regular Season
 Winners (2): 2012–13, 2021–22
 Runners-up (3): 1999–2000, 2001–02, 2017–18
 Third place (3): 2000–01, 2013–14, 2014–15

Cup
KBL Cup
 Winners (1): 2021
 Runners-up (1): 2020

Continental
FIBA Asia Champions Cup
 Third place (1): 2018

'''East Asia Super League
 Runners-up (1): 2019

References

External links

Seoul SK Knights Official website

 
Knights
Sport in Seoul
Korean Basketball League teams
Basketball teams in South Korea
Basketball teams established in 1997
1997 establishments in South Korea